Annette Joanne Taddeo-Goldstein (née Taddeo; born April 7, 1967) is a Colombian-American  politician and businesswoman serving as a member of the Florida Senate from the 40th district. She was an unsuccessful candidate for several elections starting in 2008 and was Charlie Crist's running mate in the 2014 Florida gubernatorial election. She was formerly a Democratic candidate in the 2022 Florida gubernatorial election, but withdrew to run for Congress in Florida's 27th congressional district to challenge incumbent María Elvira Salazar.

Early life and education 
Taddeo was born in Barrancabermeja, Colombia, to an Italian-American father and Colombian mother. Her early life was spent in Colombia until she moved to live with family friends in Huntsville, Alabama, at the age of 17. She graduated from the University of North Alabama with a degree in commercial Spanish. Shortly after, she moved to Miami. In 1995, Taddeo started a translation business, now called LanguageSpeak.

Career 
Taddeo entered politics in 2008 when she ran against Congresswoman Ileana Ros-Lehtinen for Florida's 18th Congressional District, which then included parts of coastal Miami-Dade and the Florida Keys. Taddeo was unopposed in the Democratic primary but lost to Ros-Lehtinen in the general election, 58 to 42%.

Two years later, Taddeo ran for an open seat on the Miami-Dade County Commission. She placed third in the nonpartisan primary, garnering 21%.

Taddeo remained active in local Democratic politics, and in December 2012 was elected chair of the county's Democratic Executive Committee. As county party chair, she organized support for successful Democratic candidates in Miami Beach, Homestead, and other local elections. She also led an effort for Democrats to compete in every local State House election in 2014. In the end, only two of the seats within the county lacked a Democratic candidate that year, the fewest since 1984.

2014 Florida gubernatorial election 

In July 2014, gubernatorial candidate Charlie Crist, who had previously served as governor as a Republican, named Taddeo as his running mate. The Crist-Taddeo ticket lost the general election to incumbent Republican Governor Rick Scott and Lieutenant Governor Carlos López-Cantera, 48.1 to 47.1%.

2016 congressional campaign 

Taddeo ran for Congress again in 2016, in the 26th district, based in southern Miami-Dade and the Florida Keys. She lost the Democratic primary to former Congressman Joe Garcia, 51.3 to 48.7%. Garcia went on to lose the general election to the incumbent, Republican Carlos Curbelo. During the campaign, some of Taddeo's secret campaign documents, some of which highlighted her weaknesses as a candidate, were made public. It later came out that Taddeo was one of several Democratic House candidates targeted by Russian hackers, and the documents were stolen from the Democratic Congressional Campaign Committee and released to reporters and bloggers in order to undermine Democratic campaigns in competitive districts.

Florida Senate 
In September 2017, Taddeo was elected in a special election for Florida's Senate District 40. The election was called to fill the vacancy caused by the resignation of Republican Senator Frank Artiles. Taddeo won the primary election against former State Representative and Miami-Dade School Board Member Ana Rivas Logan, 71 to 29%. Taddeo defeated Republican State Representative José Félix Díaz in the general election, 51 to 47%.

2022 Florida gubernatorial election 

In October 2021, Taddeo announced she would run for the Democratic primary in the 2022 Florida gubernatorial election. She opposed Charlie Crist, whom she ran alongside in his 2014 campaign for governor.

In June 2022, Taddeo announced that she would exit the gubernatorial primary and would instead run in the 2022 Florida's 27th congressional district race. Taddeo defeated Ken Russell in the primary election on August 23 to win the Democratic nomination, and unsuccessfully challenged incumbent Republican María Elvira Salazar in the November general election.

2022 congressional campaign

Taddeo won the primary in August against Miami City Commissioner Ken Russell and progressive activist Angel Montalvo. 
Despite trying to win over Latin voters in the historically Democratic Miami-Dade County and make Florida's 27th congressional district competitive, Taddeo lost by 15% to incumbent Maria Elvira Salazar.

Personal life 
Taddeo is married to Eric Goldstein, a Miami psychologist. They have a daughter, Sofia. Annette also has twin stepdaughters from her husband's previous marriage.

Taddeo was raised Catholic but converted to Judaism in her 20s.

Electoral history

Early elections, 2008–2016

Florida Senate, 2017–18

References

External links 

 Annette Taddeo for Congress campaign website
 Senator Annette Taddeo official Senate website

1967 births
21st-century American politicians
21st-century American women politicians
American people of Italian descent
American politicians of Colombian descent
Colombian Jews
Colombian people of Italian descent
Candidates in the 2008 United States elections
Candidates in the 2010 United States elections
Candidates in the 2014 United States elections
Candidates in the 2016 United States elections
Candidates in the 2022 United States House of Representatives elections
Colombian emigrants to the United States
Converts to Judaism
Democratic Party Florida state senators
Hispanic and Latino American women in politics
Jewish American politicians
Jewish American state legislators in Florida
Jewish women politicians
Living people
People from Santander Department
Politicians from Miami
University of North Alabama alumni
Women state legislators in Florida